The Slovenian Handball Supercup is a men’s professional handball competition in Slovenia, and is played between the champion of the Slovenian League and the winner of the Slovenian Cup.

Results

References

External links
Official website 

Handball competitions in Slovenia
Recurring sporting events established in 2007
2007 establishments in Slovenia